IC 26 may refer to:

 IC-26, an analogue of the opioid analgesic methadone
 NGC 135, a more common name for the lenticular galaxy IC 26